Kosmos 850 ( meaning Cosmos 850), also known as DS-P1-Yu No.79, was a Soviet satellite which was launched in 1976 as part of the Dnepropetrovsk Sputnik programme. It was a  spacecraft, which was built by the Yuzhnoye Design Bureau, and was used as a radar calibration target for anti-ballistic missile tests.

A Kosmos-2I 63SM carrier rocket was used to launch Kosmos 850 from Site 133/1 of the Plesetsk Cosmodrome. The launch occurred at 11:00 UTC on 26 August 1976, and resulted in the successfully insertion of the satellite into low Earth orbit. Upon reaching orbit, the satellite was assigned its Kosmos designation, and received the International Designator 1976-084A. The North American Aerospace Defense Command assigned it the catalogue number 09387.

Kosmos 850 was the last of seventy nine DS-P1-Yu satellites to be launched, of which seventy two successfully achieved orbit. It remained in orbit until it decayed and reentered the atmosphere on 16 May 1977.

See also

1976 in spaceflight

References

1976 in spaceflight
Kosmos satellites
Spacecraft launched in 1976
Dnepropetrovsk Sputnik program